The Umm Leisun inscription is the Old Georgian limestone tombstone slab five-line inscription written in the Georgian Asomtavruli script which was discovered in 2002, after the renewal of 1996 excavation, at a Georgian monastery of the Byzantine period, in the neighborhood of Umm Leisun, in the southern part of Sur Baher, 4.5 km southeast of the Old City of Jerusalem, found in a burial crypt under the polychrome mosaic floor.

In total about 24 interments were discovered in the crypt. Per sex estimation for human skeletons, all of them were adult males, as would be expected in a monastery. The occupant of the most important tomb identified by a Georgian inscription was a "Georgian bishop Iohane" (John in Old Georgian), who was also the oldest and his age underlined his special status. He would have been aged 66 or 67 when he died, and had suffered from osteoporosis. The inscription is the earliest known example for an ethnonym ႵႠႰႧႥႤႪႨ (kartveli i.e. Georgian) on any archaeological artifact, both in the Holy Land and in Georgia.

The inscription covers an area of 81 × 49 cm cut into the tombstone. It is dated to the end of the 5th or the first half of the 6th century AD. The inscription is kept at the Archaeological Garden of Knesset.

Inscription
ႤႱႤႱႠႫႠႰႾႭჂ
ႨႭჀႠႬႤႴႭჃႰ
ႲႠႥႤႪႤႮႨႱႩႭႮႭ
ႱႨႱႠჂႵႠႰႧႥႤ
ႪႨႱႠჂ✢
Translation: This is the grave of Iohane, Bishop of Purtavi, a Georgian.

See also
Bir el Qutt inscriptions
Georgian graffiti of Nazareth and Sinai
Epitaph of Samuel

References

Bibliography

Tchekhanovets, Y. (2014) Iohane, Bishop of Purtavi and Caucasian Albanians in the Holy Land
Khurtsilava, B. (2014) A Georgian Monastery of Purta, Istoriani
Georgian inscriptions
Archaeological artifacts
5th-century inscriptions
6th-century inscriptions
5th century in the Byzantine Empire
6th century in the Byzantine Empire
Classical sites in Jerusalem
2002 archaeological discoveries
Burial monuments and structures
Archaeological sites in the West Bank